Herochroma viridaria is a species of moth of the family Geometridae first described by Frederic Moore in 1867. It is found in Malaysia, northern Thailand, northern Vietnam, Nepal and the Chinese provinces of Fujian, Hainan, Guangxi and Sichuan.

Subspecies
Herochroma viridaria peperata (Herbulot, 1989)
Herochroma viridaria viridaria Moore, 1867

References

External links
A study on the genus Herochroma Swinhoe in China, with descriptions of four new species (Lepidoptera: Geometridae: Geometrinae). Acta Entomologica Sinica

Moths described in 1867
Pseudoterpnini
Moths of Asia